Vladimir Sosnovsky (1922–1990) was a Ukrainian artist, known as a landscape and realist painter. He was born in Novaya Ushitza, Khmelnitzky Region, Ukraine. In 1928 his family moved to Odessa. As a child he showed a love of drawing, and his parents sent him to art school.

In 1939 he joined the Odessa Grekov Art College, but with the onset of World War II, after completing only two years of study, he was asked to serve at the front. On his return in 1945, he continued his studies under well-known artist L. Mutchnik.

In 1948 he entered the Kiev Art Institute and graduated in 1954. He then worked as a deputy director at the Odessa Western and Oriental Art Museum. From 1956 he taught painting at the Odessa Theatre and Art College until his death in 1990.

Sosnovsky did not promote his art or himself, or try to be a fashionable painter. Obsessed with painting, he spent his free time painting en plein air. He loved nature and painted it obsessively.

Sincerity was Sosnovsky' main characteristic, his motto and his goal. Touched by Sosnovsky's art — his lyricism and alive romanticism — a well-known modern artist said after visiting his posthumous exhibition, "I've began to doubt my own methods after seeing Sosnovsky's Realism. I admit my defeat."

External links
 Short biography at The Russian Art Gallery.

1922 births
1990 deaths
Landscape painters
Russian artists
20th-century Ukrainian painters
20th-century Ukrainian male artists
Ukrainian male painters
Soviet artists